Ronald William Hassey (born February 27, 1953) is an American former professional baseball player. He played in Major League Baseball (MLB) as a catcher for the Cleveland Indians (1978–1984), Chicago Cubs (1984), New York Yankees (1985–1986), Chicago White Sox (1986–1987), Oakland Athletics (1988–1990), and Montreal Expos (1991). Hassey is notable for being the only catcher in MLB history to have caught more than one perfect game (the first with Len Barker in 1981  and his second with Dennis Martínez in 1991). Hassey joined Gus Triandos as the only catchers in MLB history to have caught a no-hitter in both leagues.

Early life
Hassey is the son of Joseph Bill Hassey, a former baseball player in the New York Yankees’ minor-league system.  He was born and raised in Tucson, Arizona, and attended Tucson High Magnet School where, in 1972, his team went undefeated and won the state championship. Ron was often referred to as the Pride of Tucson. He went to the University of Arizona, where he was coached by Jerry Kindall. In Hassey's senior year (1976) the Wildcats won their first of three NCAA Championship's under Kindall.  Hassey's father also played for Tucson High Magnet School and the University of Arizona.

Playing career (1976–91)

Minor leagues
Hassey was drafted by the Cleveland Indians in the 18th round of the 1976 amateur draft.  He played for the San Jose Bees, the Williamsport Tomahawks, the Toledo Mud Hens, and the Portland Beavers.

MLB regular season
He made his MLB debut on April 23, 1978, and played his final game on September 3, 1991. He played in 1,192 regular season games, finishing with a .266 batting average, 71 home runs, and 438 runs batted in. He had the highest average among all catchers in the 1980 baseball season with a .318 batting average. On May 15, 1981, Hassey caught starting pitcher Len Barker's perfect game against the Toronto Blue Jays. On June 13, 1984, Hassey was involved in a high-profile trade, when the Cleveland Indians traded him along with Rick Sutcliffe and George Frazier to the Chicago Cubs in exchange for Joe Carter, Mel Hall and Don Schulze. While with the Oakland Athletics he was known for almost exclusively catching all of starting pitcher Bob Welch's games, most notably during the 1990 season in which Welch won 27 games and earned the Cy Young Award trophy. On July 28, 1991, he caught Dennis Martínez's perfect game against the Los Angeles Dodgers. He had been catching Martínez exclusively that season with the Expos.

MLB postseason
Hassey played for the Athletics in three World Series. He was a member of the A's team that lost to the Los Angeles Dodgers in the 1988 World Series, and he was catching Dennis Eckersley during the legendary Kirk Gibson's 1988 World Series home run. He was also a member of the A's team that defeated the San Francisco Giants in the 1989 World Series (though he did not play in the series), and lost to the Cincinnati Reds in the 1990 World Series. In five postseason series, Hassey tallied an impressive career postseason .323 batting average.

Post-playing career (1992–present)
Hassey was a coach for the expansion Colorado Rockies from 1993 to 1995, and for the St. Louis Cardinals in 1996.  He then served as a scout for the Arizona Diamondbacks from 1997 to 2003. He managed the Carolina Mudcats in 2004, and in 2005–06 served as a bench coach for the Seattle Mariners under manager Mike Hargrove. Hargrove and Hassey played together for the Cleveland Indians from 1979 to 1984.  He spent the 2011 season managing the Miami Marlins' Class A Affiliate, the Jupiter Hammerheads.  He spent the 2012–2013 season managing, Miami Marlins' Triple-A Affiliate, the New Orleans Zephyrs. The last game for the New Orleans Zephyrs, Hassey announced he was going to retire from baseball.

See also

 Perfect game
 Dennis Martínez's perfect game
 Len Barker's perfect game
 List of St. Louis Cardinals coaches

References

External links

Baseball Gauge
Retrosheet
Venezuelan Professional Baseball League

1953 births
Living people
American expatriate baseball players in Canada
Arizona Diamondbacks scouts
Arizona Wildcats baseball players
Baseball coaches from Arizona
Baseball players at the 1975 Pan American Games
Baseball players from Tucson, Arizona
Chicago Cubs players
Chicago White Sox players
Cleveland Indians players
Colorado Rockies (baseball) coaches
Hawaii Islanders players
Leones del Caracas players
American expatriate baseball players in Venezuela
Major League Baseball bench coaches
Major League Baseball catchers
Minor league baseball managers
Montreal Expos players
New York Yankees players
New York Yankees scouts
Oakland Athletics players
Pan American Games medalists in baseball
Pan American Games silver medalists for the United States
Portland Beavers players
St. Louis Cardinals coaches
San Jose Bees players
Seattle Mariners coaches
Tacoma Tugs players
Toledo Mud Hens players
Tucson High School alumni
University of Arizona alumni
Williamsport Tomahawks players
Medalists at the 1975 Pan American Games